The Triton 22 is an American trailerable sailboat, that was designed by Gary Mull and first built in 1985. The design is out of production.

Production
The boat was built for a short time by Pearson Yachts, using the molds for the US Yachts US 22, from which it was derived. The Triton 22 shares the same specifications as the US 22.

Design
The Triton 22 is a small recreational keelboat, built predominantly of fiberglass, with wood trim. It has a fractional sloop rig, a transom hung rudder, a fin keel and may be fitted with a spinnaker for downwind sailing. It displaces , carries  of ballast.

The boat is normally fitted with a small  outboard motor for docking and maneuvering.

The design has sleeping accommodation for five people, with a double "V"-berth in the bow cabin, a drop-down dinette table on the port side that forms a double berth and a quarter berth on the starboard side of the main cabin. The galley is located on the starboard side just aft of the bow cabin and is "U"-shaped and is equipped with a two-burner stove and a sink. The portable head is located on the port side of bow cabin under the "V"-berth.

Operational history
In a 2010 review Steve Henkel wrote, "Best features: The four-seater dinette is wide, extending to almost half the 7' 10" beam, and converts to a full-length double berth. The PHRF rating seems generous. Owners reporting on the Internet seem to think the boat is reasonably fast, well made, and generally very satisfactory. Worst features: Compared to comps, the draft is a little high, the ballast a little low, and the headroom low, too."

See also
List of sailing boat types
Related development
Triton 25
Similar sailboats
Alberg 22
Cape Dory 22
CS 22
DS-22
Edel 665
Nonsuch 22
Santana 22
Starwind 223
Tanzer 22

References

Keelboats
Trailer sailers
1980s sailboat type designs
Sailing yachts
Sailboat type designs by Gary Mull
Sailboat types built by Pearson Yachts